Deliphrum is a genus of beetles belonging to the family Staphylinidae.

Synonyms:
 Arpediopsis Ganglbauer, 1895
 Adeliphron Agassiz, 1846

Species:
 Deliphrum tectum

References

Staphylinidae
Staphylinidae genera